McHarry's Buslines is a family-owned bus company in Geelong, Victoria, dating back to 1932. It operates public transport bus routes in Geelong, and on the Bellarine Peninsula and the Surf Coast, as well as school bus and charter services. The company's main depot is in Breakwater, and there are smaller depots in Apollo Bay, Torquay, Ocean Grove, Queenscliff and Drysdale. There used to be a depot in Portarlington, but it has been replaced by the one at Drysdale.

History
The origins of McHarry's Buslines date back to 1932, when John McHarry was employed at Ford's Geelong plant as a coach-builder. He transported his own employees to the plant in his truck, and it wasn't long before he was inundated with requests from other Ford workers for a ride to work. The current managing director of the company, also called John McHarry, is the grandson of the original owner. His son, Ashley McHarry, is the company's general manager.

Livery
Following the inauguration of the Geelong Transit System (GTS) in the early 1980s, McHarry's public transport buses were obliged to be painted in the GTS livery. After 2000, however, the company's contract with the Victorian Government no longer required its GTS buses to wear the system livery, and so buses were progressively re-painted with McHarry's own new livery.

Fleet
As at June 2022, the company's fleet consisted of 225 buses.

References

Bus companies of Victoria (Australia)
Transport in Geelong
Australian companies established in 1932
Transport companies established in 1932
Family-owned companies of Australia